Leeds/Bradford Airport Parkway station is a proposed railway station near Horsforth, Leeds, in West Yorkshire. It would have around 300 parking spaces serving Leeds Bradford Airport along with adjoining areas including Cookridge, Bramhope and Yeadon and would be situated on the existing Leeds-Harrogate-York route north of the existing  station.

The scheme is intended to optimise the use and future development of existing infrastructure and services and is thus efficient of taxpayer funds. Earlier plans, now discounted on grounds of technical feasibility, capital and operating costs, have previously been suggested by various organisations including the Campaign for Better Transport as an alternative to a major new road scheme in the area. Studies have found that a heavy rail service from the Leeds to Harrogate line would face gradients that "exceed the typical maximum gradient that heavy rail can operate over a sustained distance. Even though the gradients involved appeared to be too steep for conventional trains, it was included in a strategic development plan published by the airport for public consultation, where a service by tram-trains had been suggested.
 
The new proposal being developed since 2016, together with the bus links was initiated by the Harrogate Line Supporters Group. The station is one of four new stations announced in the Governments ‘Connecting People: A Strategic Vision for Rail’ along with Thorpe Park, White Rose and Elland.

References

External links

Proposed railway stations in England